Jamaica competed at the 2022 Commonwealth Games at Birmingham, England from 28 July to 8 August 2022. It was Jamaica's eighteenth and last appearance at the Games, as they've chosen to leave the Commonwealth.

Rugby sevens athlete Oshane Edie and netballer Jhaniele Fowler were the flagbearers during the opening ceremony, while swimmers Sydrell Williams and Zaneta Alvaranga were the closing ceremony flagbearers.

Medalists

Competitors
The following is the list of number of competitors participating at the Games per sport/discipline.

Athletics

Men
Track and road events

Field events

Women
Track and road events

Field events

Badminton

A squad of four players (two per gender) was selected on 18 May 2022. Jamaica also qualified for the mixed team event (via the BWF World Rankings) as of 1 June 2022.

Singles

Doubles

Mixed team

Summary

Squad

Joel Angus
Samuel Ricketts
Tahlia Richardson
Katherine Wynter

Group stage

Boxing

Men

Cycling

Road
Women

Track
Sprint

Keirin

Time trial

Diving

One diver (Yona Knight-Wisdom) was selected.

Gymnastics

Artistic
Men
Individual Qualification

Women
Individual Qualification

Judo

Lawn bowls

Netball

By virtue of its position in the World Netball Rankings (as of 28 July 2021), Jamaica qualified for the tournament.

Partial fixtures were announced in November 2021, then updated with the remaining qualifiers in March 2022.

Summary

Roster

Jhaniele Fowler
Shanice Beckford
Shamera Sterling
Shimona Nelson
Rebekah Robinson
Adean Thomas
Khadijah Williams
Shadian Hemmings
Latanya Wilson
Kadie-Ann Dehaney
Jodi-Ann Ward
Dixon-Rochester Nicole Anita

Group play

Semifinals

Finals

Rugby sevens

As of 24 April 2022, Jamaica qualified for the men's tournament. This was achieved through their position in the 2022 RAN Sevens Qualifiers.

Summary

Men's tournament
Roster
 
Tyler Bush
Ronaldeni Fraser
Rhodri Adamson
Oshane Edie
Michael St. Claire
Mason Caton-Brown
Lucas Roy-Smith
Gareth Stoppani
Fabion Turner
Dy'neal Fessal
Conan Osborne
Ashley Smith
Omar Dixon

Pool D

Classification Quarterfinals

13th-16th Semifinals

13th place match

Squash

Swimming

Seven swimmers (four men, three women) were selected.

Men

Women

Table tennis

Three players (two men, one woman) qualified for the competitions.

Singles

Doubles

Triathlon

Individual

Weightlifting

Four weightlifters (one man, three women) were selected. Sientje Henderson qualified via the IWF Commonwealth Ranking List, whereas the other three were awarded Bipartite Invitations.

Wrestling

See also
Jamaica at the 2022 Winter Olympics

References

External links
Jamaica Olympic Association Official site

Nations at the 2022 Commonwealth Games
Jamaica at the Commonwealth Games
2022 in Jamaican sport